Story of a Girl is a 2017 American drama television film directed by Kyra Sedgwick and written by Laurie Collyer and Emily Bickford Lansbury, based on the 2007 novel of the same name by Sara Zarr. The film stars Kevin Bacon, Jon Tenney, Ryann Shane, Sosie Bacon and Tyler Johnston. It aired on July 23, 2017 in the United States on the Lifetime network.

Cast
 Kevin Bacon as Michael
 Jon Tenney as Ray Lambert
 Ryann Shane as Deanna Lambert
 Sosie Bacon as Stacey
 Tyler Johnston as Tommy Webber
 Caroline Cave as Debbie Lambert
 Michael Maize as Mr. North
 Sarah Grey as Caitlin Spinelli

Production
Producers Kyra Sedgwick and Emily Bickford Lansbury optioned the film. Laurie Collyer wrote the first draft of the screenplay and Lansbury wrote the final version.

Reception
The film received positive reviews from critics, which was praised for Sedgwick's directing.

References

External links

2017 television films
2017 films
2017 drama films
2010s American films
2010s English-language films
American drama television films
Films based on American novels
Films directed by Kyra Sedgwick
Lifetime (TV network) films
Television films based on books